Molybdenum disulfide (or moly) is an inorganic compound composed of molybdenum and sulfur.

The compound is classified as a transition metal dichalcogenide. It is a silvery black solid that occurs as the mineral molybdenite, the principal ore for molybdenum.  is relatively unreactive. It is unaffected by dilute acids and oxygen. In appearance and feel, molybdenum disulfide is similar to graphite. It is widely used as a dry lubricant because of its low friction and robustness. Bulk  is a diamagnetic, indirect bandgap semiconductor similar to silicon, with a bandgap of 1.23 eV.

Production 
MoS2 is naturally found as either molybdenite, a crystalline mineral, or jordisite, a rare low temperature form of molybdenite. Molybdenite ore is processed by flotation to give relatively pure . The main contaminant is carbon.  also arises by thermal treatment of virtually all molybdenum compounds with hydrogen sulfide or elemental sulfur and can be produced by metathesis reactions from molybdenum pentachloride.

Structure and physical properties

Crystalline phases 
All forms of  have a layered structure, in which a plane of molybdenum atoms is sandwiched by planes of sulfide ions. These three strata form a monolayer of MoS2. Bulk MoS2 consists of stacked monolayers, which are held together by weak van der Waals interactions.

Crystalline MoS2 is the only transition metal chalcogenide found in nature. It exists in one of two phases, 2H-MoS2 and 3R-MoS2, where the "H" and the "R" indicate hexagonal and rhombohedral symmetry, respectively. In both of these structures, each molybdenum atom exists at the center of a trigonal prismatic coordination sphere and is covalently bonded to six sulfide ions. Each sulfur atom has pyramidal coordination and is bonded to three molybdenum atoms. Both the 2H- and 3R-phases are semiconducting.

A third, metastable crystalline phase known as 1T-MoS2 was discovered by intercalating 2H-MoS2 with alkali metals. This phase has tetragonal symmetry and is metallic. The 1T-phase can be stabilized through doping with electron donors such as rhenium, or converted back to the 2H-phase by microwave radiation. The 2H/1T-phase transition can be controlled via the incorporation of S vacancies.

Allotropes

Exfoliated MoS2 flakes
While bulk MoS2 in the 2H-phase is known to be an indirect-band gap semiconductor, monolayer MoS2 has a direct band gap. The layer-dependent optoelectronic properties of MoS2 have promoted much research in 2-dimensional MoS2-based devices. 2D MoS2 can be produced by exfoliating bulk crystals to produce single-layer to few-layer flakes either through a dry, micromechanical process or through solution processing.

Micromechanical exfoliation, also pragmatically called "Scotch-tape exfoliation", involves using an adhesive material to repeatedly peel apart a layered crystal by overcoming the van der Waals forces. The crystal flakes can then be transferred from the adhesive film to a substrate. This facile method was first used by Konstantin Novoselov and Andre Geim to obtain graphene from graphite crystals. However, it can not be employed for a uniform 1-D layers because of weaker adhesion of MoS2 to the substrate (either Si, glass or quartz). The aforementioned scheme is good for graphene only. While Scotch tape is generally used as the adhesive tape, PDMS stamps can also satisfactorily cleave MoS2 if it is important to avoid contaminating the flakes with residual adhesive.

Liquid-phase exfoliation can also be used to produce monolayer to multi-layer MoS2 in solution. A few methods include lithium intercalation to delaminate the layers and sonication in a high-surface tension solvent.

Mechanical properties 
MoS2 excels as a lubricating material (see below) due to its layered structure and low coefficient of friction. Interlayer sliding dissipates energy when a shear stress is applied to the material. Extensive work has been performed to characterize the coefficient of friction and shear strength of MoS2 in various atmospheres. The shear strength of MoS2 increases as the coefficient of friction increases. This property is called superlubricity. At ambient conditions, the coefficient of friction for MoS2 was determined to be 0.150, with a corresponding estimated shear strength of 56.0 MPa (megapascals). Direct methods of measuring the shear strength indicate that the value is closer to 25.3 MPa.

The wear resistance of MoS2 in lubricating applications can be increased by doping MoS2 with Cr. Microindentation experiments on nanopillars of Cr-doped MoS2 found that the yield strength increased from an average of 821 MPa for pure MoS2 (at 0% Cr) to 1017 MPa  at 50% Cr. The increase in yield strength is accompanied by a change in the failure mode of the material. While the pure MoS2 nanopillar fails through a plastic bending mechanism, brittle fracture modes become apparent as the material is loaded with increasing amounts of dopant.

The widely used method of micromechanical exfoliation has been carefully studied in MoS2 to understand the mechanism of delamination in few-layer to multi-layer flakes. The exact mechanism of cleavage was found to be layer dependent. Flakes thinner than 5 layers undergo homogenous bending and rippling, while flakes around 10 layers thick delaminated through interlayer sliding. Flakes with more than 20 layers exhibited a kinking mechanism during micromechanical cleavage. The cleavage of these flakes was also determined to be reversible due to the nature of van der Waals bonding.

In recent years, MoS2 has been utilized in flexible electronic applications, promoting more investigation into the elastic properties of this material. Nanoscopic bending tests using AFM cantilever tips were performed on micromechanically exfoliated MoS2 flakes that were deposited on a holey substrate. The yield strength of monolayer flakes was 270 GPa, while the thicker flakes were also stiffer, with a yield strength of 330 GPa. Molecular dynamic simulations found the in-plane yield strength of MoS2 to be 229 GPa, which matches the experimental results within error.

Bertolazzi and coworkers also characterized the failure modes of the suspended monolayer flakes. The strain at failure ranges from 6 to 11%. The average yield strength of monolayer MoS2 is 23 GPa, which is close to the theoretical fracture strength for defect-free MoS2.

The band structure of MoS2 is sensitive to strain.

Chemical reactions 
Molybdenum disulfide is stable in air and attacked only by aggressive reagents. It reacts with oxygen upon heating forming molybdenum trioxide:
 2  + 7  → 2  + 4 

Chlorine attacks molybdenum disulfide at elevated temperatures to form molybdenum pentachloride:
 2  + 7  → 2  + 2

Intercalation reactions
Molybdenum disulfide is a host for formation of intercalation compounds. This behavior is relevant to its use as a cathode material in batteries. One example is a lithiated material, .

Applications

Lubricant 

Due to weak van der Waals interactions between the sheets of sulfide atoms,  has a low coefficient of friction.  in particle sizes in the range of 1–100 µm is a common dry lubricant. Few alternatives exist that confer high lubricity and stability at up to 350 °C in oxidizing environments. Sliding friction tests of  using a pin on disc tester at low loads (0.1–2 N) give friction coefficient values of <0.1.

 is often a component of blends and composites that require low friction. For example, it is added to graphite to improve sticking. A variety of oils and greases are used, because they retain their lubricity even in cases of almost complete oil loss, thus finding a use in critical applications such as aircraft engines. When added to plastics,  forms a composite with improved strength as well as reduced friction. Polymers that may be filled with  include nylon (trade name Nylatron), Teflon and Vespel. Self-lubricating composite coatings for high-temperature applications consist of molybdenum disulfide and titanium nitride, using chemical vapor deposition.

Examples of applications of -based lubricants include two-stroke engines (such as motorcycle engines), bicycle coaster brakes, automotive CV and universal joints, ski waxes and bullets.

Other layered inorganic materials that exhibit lubricating properties (collectively known as solid lubricants (or dry lubricants)) includes graphite, which requires volatile additives and hexagonal boron nitride.

Catalysis 

 is employed as a cocatalyst for desulfurization in petrochemistry, for example, hydrodesulfurization. The effectiveness of the  catalysts is enhanced by doping with small amounts of cobalt or nickel. The intimate mixture of these sulfides is supported on alumina. Catalysis does not occur at the regular sheet-like regions of the crystallites, but instead at the edge of these planes.

MoS2 finds use as a hydrogenation catalyst for organic synthesis. It is derived from a common transition metal, rather than group 10 metal as are many alternatives, MoS2 is chosen when catalyst price or resistance to sulfur poisoning are of primary concern. MoS2 is effective for the hydrogenation of nitro compounds to amines and can be used to produce secondary amines via reductive amination. The catalyst can also can effect hydrogenolysis of organosulfur compounds, aldehydes, ketones, phenols and carboxylic acids to their respective alkanes. The catalyst suffers from rather low activity however, often requiring hydrogen pressures above 95 atm and temperatures above 185 °C.

Research 
 plays an important role in condensed matter physics research.

Hydrogen evolution
 and related molybdenum sulfides are efficient catalysts for hydrogen evolution, including the electrolysis of water; thus, are possibly useful to produce hydrogen for use in fuel cells.

Oxygen reduction and evolution 
MoS2@Fe-N-C core/shell nanosphere with atomic Fe-doped surface and interface (MoS2/Fe-N-C) can be used as a used an electrocatalyst for oxygen reduction and evolution reactions (ORR and OER)  bifunctionally because of reduced energy barrier due to Fe-N4 dopants and unique nature of MoS2/Fe-N-C interface.

Microelectronics
Bulk  has an indirect band gap of 1.2 eV, while  monolayers have a direct 1.8 eV electronic bandgap, supporting switchable transistors and photodetectors.

 nanoflakes can be used for solution-processed fabrication of layered memristive and memcapacitive devices through engineering a / heterostructure sandwiched between silver electrodes. -based memristors are mechanically flexible, optically transparent and can be produced at low cost.

The sensitivity of a graphene field-effect transistor (FET) biosensor is fundamentally restricted by the zero band gap of graphene, which results in increased leakage and reduced sensitivity. In digital electronics, transistors control current flow throughout an integrated circuit and allow for amplification and switching. In biosensing, the physical gate is removed and the binding between embedded receptor molecules and the charged target biomolecules to which they are exposed modulates the current.

MoS2 has been investigated as a component of flexible circuits.

In 2017 a 115-transistor, 1-bit microprocessor implementation using two-dimensional .

MoS2 has been used to create 2D 2-terminal memristors and 3-terminal memtransistors.

Valleytronics 
Due to the lack of spatial inversion symmetry, odd-layer MoS2 is a promising material for valleytronics because both the CBM and VBM have two energy-degenerate valleys at the corners of the first Brillouin zone, providing an exciting opportunity to store the information of 0s and 1s at different discrete values of the crystal momentum. The Berry curvature is even under spatial inversion (P) and odd under time reversal (T), the valley Hall effect cannot survive when both P and T symmetries are present. To excite valley Hall effect in specific valleys, circularly polarized lights were used for breaking the T symmetry in atomically thin transition-metal dichalcogenides. In monolayer MoS2, the T and mirror symmetries lock the spin and valley indices of the sub-bands split by the spin-orbit couplings, both of which are flipped under T; the spin conservation suppresses the inter-valley scattering. Therefore, monolayer MoS2 have been deemed an ideal platform for realizing intrinsic valley Hall effect without extrinsic symmetry breaking.

Photonics and photovoltaics 
 also possesses mechanical strength, electrical conductivity, and can emit light, opening possible applications such as photodetectors.  has been investigated as a component of photoelectrochemical (e.g. for photocatalytic hydrogen production) applications and for microelectronics applications.

Superconductivity of monolayers
Under an electric field  monolayers have been found to superconduct at temperatures below 9.4 K.

See also 
 Molybdenum diselenide

References

External links 
 

Molybdenum(IV) compounds
Sulfides
Non-petroleum based lubricants
Dry lubricants
Semiconductor materials
Transition metal dichalcogenides
Hydrogenation catalysts
Monolayers